Dheivatheyorthu is a 1985 Indian Malayalam film,  directed by R. Gopi. The film stars Balachandra Menon, Prem Nazir, Srividya, Innocent and Urvashi in the lead roles. The film has musical score by M. G. Radhakrishnan.

Cast

Prem Nazir
Srividya
Innocent
Urvashi as Nani
Balachandra Menon as Aniyankuttan
Sankaradi
Santhosh as Shaji
Baiju
Kottarakkara Sreedharan Nair
Kottayam Valsalan
Santha Devi

Soundtrack
The music was composed by M. G. Radhakrishnan and the lyrics were written by Kavalam Narayana Panicker.

References

External links
 

 കക്കക്കക്ക  കാവദി കാക്കേ ... ഗാനം  വന്ന വഴി : https://www.facebook.com/kaladevi.vs.5/posts/615165538643311

1985 films
1980s Malayalam-language films